Eucosmophora melanactis is a moth of the family Gracillariidae. It is known from Guyana.

The length of the forewings is 3.5 mm for males.

References

Acrocercopinae
Moths described in 1915